Marina Person is a Brazilian actress, filmmaker and former MTV VJ. She hosts the TV shows Top Top MTV, with Leo Madeira, and MTV+.

In 2007, Marina Person released the documentary Person about the life of her father, the also filmmaker Luis Sérgio Person.

References

Living people
1969 births
Brazilian film actresses
Actresses from São Paulo